Superfruit (often stylized as SUP3RFRUIT) is an American musical and comedy duo consisting of Mitch Grassi and Scott Hoying, both known as members of the a cappella group Pentatonix. Superfruit is also the name of their comedy show,  featured on their eponymous YouTube channel. Their channel was created in August 2013 with a focus on comedic vlogs and music performances. , the channel has over 2.4 million subscribers and over 419 million views.

In 2016, the duo became more involved in musical activities, with the releases of their first original songs, "Bad 4 Us" on October 18 and "Sweet Life" on November 15. On June 30, 2017, the duo released their first EP, Future Friends: Part One, followed on September 15 by both the EP Future Friends: Part Two, and Future Friends, which acted as a compilation album containing both EPs and Superfruit's debut studio album. Superfruit's sound differs from their a capella work with Pentatonix as it features electric and electronic instruments, while retaining their usual pop, melody-oriented style.

YouTube channel 

According to Grassi, he and Hoying were at IHOP and discussed how they wanted to individually start YouTube channels, but eventually decided to launch one together. According to Hoying, the name Superfruit "came from Mitch's random mind". The first Superfruit video was uploaded on August 13, 2013.

Superfruit consists mainly of comedic vlogs and various casual games and competitions, but the channel also features a number of musical projects. Most videos solely feature Hoying and Grassi, but some include other musical artists or non-musical guests. Both Grassi and Hoying identify as gay.

In 2019, ice skater Adam Rippon appeared in Superfruit's "The Promise" music video.

Discography

Studio albums

Extended plays

Singles

Tours 
Future Friends Tour (2018)

Other notable works 
Outside of their YouTube channel, Superfruit promoted The SpongeBob Movie: Sponge Out of Water with an MTV commercial in which Grassi receives a tattoo of SpongeBob SquarePants on his arm.

Grassi and Hoying have been featured on other artists' music, such as Betty Who's "Beautiful" from her studio album The Valley. Additionally, Superfruit was featured alongside Kirstin Maldonado on Todrick Hall's "Black & White" from the deluxe edition of Straight Outta Oz.

In January 2018, the duo guest starred on Good Mythical Morning where they played the "Duo or Don't-O Challenge".

Awards and nominations

World Choreography Awards

References

External links 
 

LGBT YouTubers
YouTube channels
American gay musicians
American LGBT singers
21st-century American LGBT people